Minnesota Valley Lutheran High School (MVL) is a private school located just outside New Ulm, Minnesota. The current building was built in 1979; the school was founded as a faith-based institution. MVL is owned by the Minnesota Valley Lutheran Association consisting of 21 congregations of the Evangelical Lutheran Synod and the Wisconsin Evangelical Lutheran Synod. Enrollment averages 200 students in grades 9 through 12.

Sports 

 Baseball
 Boys' basketball
 Girls' basketball
 Cross-country
 Football
 Golf
 Softball
 Track & field team
 Volleyball
 Boys' tennis (co-op)
 Girls' tennis (co-op)
 Boys' soccer (co-op)
 Girls' soccer (co-op)
 Wrestling (co-op)
 Hockey (co-op)
 Gymnastics (co-op)
 Downhill Skiing (co-op)
 Curling (co-op)

References

External links

Lutheran schools in Minnesota
Schools in Brown County, Minnesota
Private high schools in Minnesota
New Ulm, Minnesota
Secondary schools affiliated with the Wisconsin Evangelical Lutheran Synod